Parade is a musical with a book by Alfred Uhry and music and lyrics by Jason Robert Brown. The musical is a dramatization of the 1913 trial and imprisonment, and 1915 lynching, of Jewish American Leo Frank in Georgia.

The musical premiered on Broadway in December 1998 and won Tony Awards for Best Book and Best Original Score (out of nine nominations) and six Drama Desk Awards. After closing on Broadway in February 1999, the show has had a US national tour and a few professional productions in the US and UK, as well as a critically well-received revival on Broadway in 2023.

Background and genesis

The musical dramatizes the 1913 trial of Jewish factory manager Leo Frank, who was accused and convicted of raping and murdering a thirteen-year-old employee, Mary Phagan. The trial, sensationalized by the media, aroused antisemitic tensions in Atlanta and the U.S. state of Georgia. When Frank's death sentence was commuted to life in prison by the departing Governor of Georgia, John M. Slaton, in 1915 due to his detailed review of over 10,000 pages of testimony and possible problems with the trial, Leo Frank was transferred to a prison in Milledgeville, Georgia, where a lynching party seized and kidnapped him. Frank was taken to Phagan's hometown of Marietta, Georgia, and he was hanged from an oak tree. The events surrounding the investigation and trial led to two groups emerging: the revival of the defunct KKK and the birth of the Jewish Civil Rights organization, the Anti-Defamation League (ADL).

Director Harold Prince turned to Jason Robert Brown to write the score after Stephen Sondheim turned the project down. Prince's daughter, Daisy, had brought Brown to her father's attention. Book writer Alfred Uhry, who grew up in Atlanta, had personal knowledge of the Frank story, as his great-uncle owned the pencil factory run by Leo Frank.

The musical's story concludes that the likely killer was the factory janitor Jim Conley, the key witness against Frank at the trial.  The villains of the piece are the ambitious and corrupt prosecutor Hugh Dorsey (later the governor of Georgia and then a judge) and the rabidly anti-semitic publisher Tom Watson (later elected a U.S. senator). Prince and Uhry emphasized the evolving relationship between Frank and his wife Lucille. Their relationship shifts from cold to warm in songs like "Leo at Work/What am I Waiting For?," "You Don't Know This Man," "Do it Alone," and "All the Wasted Time". The poignancy of the couple, who fall in love in the midst of adversity, is the core of the work. It makes the tragic outcome – the miscarriage of justice – even more disturbing.

The show was Brown's first Broadway production. His music, according to critic Charles Isherwood, has "subtle and appealing melodies that draw on a variety of influences, from pop-rock to folk to rhythm and blues and gospel."

Plot

Act I
The musical opens in Marietta, Georgia, in the time of the American Civil War. The sounds of drums herald the appearance of a young Confederate soldier, bidding farewell to his sweetheart as he goes to fight for his homeland. The years pass and suddenly it is 1913. The young soldier has become an old one-legged veteran who is preparing to march in the annual Confederate Memorial Day parade ("The Old Red Hills of Home"). As the Parade begins ("The Dream of Atlanta"), Leo Frank, a Yankee Jew from Brooklyn, New York, is deeply uncomfortable in the town in which he works and resides, feeling out of place due to his Judaism and his college education ("How Can I Call This Home?"). His discomfort is present even in his relationship with his wife Lucille, who has planned an outdoor meal spoiled by Leo's decision to go into work on a holiday. Meanwhile, two local teens, Frankie Epps and Mary Phagan, ride a trolley car and flirt. Frankie wants Mary to go to the picture show with him, but Mary playfully resists, insisting her mother will not let her ("The Picture Show").  Mary leaves to collect her pay from the pencil factory managed by Leo.

While Leo is at work, Lucille bemoans the state of their marriage, believing herself unappreciated by a man so wrapped up in himself. She reflects on her unfulfilled life and wonders whether or not Leo was the right match for her ("Leo at Work" / "What Am I Waiting For?"). Mary Phagan arrives in Leo's office to collect her paycheck. That night, police Detective Starnes and Officer Ivey rouse Leo from his sleep, and without telling him why, demand he accompany them to the factory, where Mary's body has been found raped and murdered in the basement. The police immediately suspect Newt Lee, the African-American night watchman who discovered the body ("Interrogation"). Throughout his interrogation, Lee maintains his innocence, but he inadvertently directs Starnes' suspicion upon Leo, who did not answer his telephone when Lee called him to report the incident. Leo is arrested, but not charged, and Mrs. Phagan, Mary's mother, becomes aware of Mary's death.

Across town, reporter Britt Craig is informed about Mary's murder and sees the possibility of a career-making story ("Big News"). Craig attends Mary's funeral, where the townspeople of Marietta are angry, mournful, and baffled by the tragedy that has so unexpectedly shattered the community. ("There is a Fountain" / "It Don't Make Sense"). Frankie Epps swears revenge on Mary's killer, as does Tom Watson, a writer for The Jeffersonian, an extremist right-wing newspaper ("Tom Watson's Lullaby") who has taken a special interest in the case. Governor John Slaton pressures the local prosecutor Hugh Dorsey to get to the bottom of the whole affair. Dorsey, an ambitious politician with a "lousy conviction record", resolves to find the murderer. Dorsey, Starnes and Ivey interrogate Newt Lee, but they receive no information. Dorsey releases Newt, reasoning that "hanging another Nigra ain't enough this time. We gotta do better." He then attaches the blame to Leo Frank and sends Starnes and a reluctant Ivey out to find eyewitnesses ("Something Ain't Right"). Craig exalts in his opportunity to cover a "real" story and begins an effective campaign vilifying Leo. ("Real Big News").

Leo meets with his lawyer Luther Z. Rosser, who vows to "win this case, and send him home". Meanwhile, Dorsey makes a deal with factory janitor and ex-convict Jim Conley to testify against Leo in exchange for immunity for a previous escape from prison. Lucille, hounded by reporters, collapses from the strain and privately rebukes Craig when he attempts to obtain an interview ("You Don't Know This Man"). She tells her husband that she cannot bear to see his trial, but he begs her to stay in the courtroom, as her not appearing would make him look guilty.

The trial of Leo Frank begins, presided over by Judge Roan. A hysterical crowd gathers outside the courtroom, as Watson spews invective ("Hammer of Justice") and Dorsey begins the case for the prosecution ("Twenty Miles from Marietta"). The prosecution produces a series of witnesses, most of whom give trumped evidence which was clearly fed to them by Dorsey. Frankie Epps testifies, falsely, that Mary mentioned that Leo "looks at her funny" when they last spoke, a sentiment echoed verbatim by three of Mary's teenage co-workers, Lola, Essie and Monteen ("The Factory Girls"). In a fantasy sequence, Leo becomes the lecherous seducer from their testimony ("Come Up to My Office"). Testimony is heard from Mary's mother ("My Child Will Forgive Me") and Minnie McKnight before the prosecution's star witness, Jim Conley, takes the stand. He claims that he witnessed the murder and helped Leo conceal the crime ("That's What He Said"). Leo is desperate. As Dorsey whips the observers and jurors at the trial into a frenzy, Leo is given the opportunity to deliver a statement. Leo offers a heartfelt speech, pleading to be believed ("It's Hard to Speak My Heart"), but it is not enough.  He is found guilty and sentenced to hang. The crowd breaks out into a jubilant cakewalk as Lucille and Leo embrace, terrified ("Summation and Cakewalk").

Act II
It's now 1914 and Leo has begun his process of appeal. The trial has been noted by the press in the north, and the reaction is strongly disapproving of the way in which it was conducted, but the African-American domestics wonder if the reaction would have been as strong if the victim had been Black ("A Rumblin' and a Rollin'"). Lucille tries to help Leo with his appeal, but reveals crucial information to Craig, provoking an argument between Leo and Lucille ("Do it Alone"). Lucille finds Governor Slaton at a party ("Pretty Music") and attempts to advocate for Leo. She accuses him of either being a fool or a coward if he accepts the outcome of the trial as is. Meanwhile, Watson approaches Dorsey and tells him that he will support his bid for governor should he choose to make it. Dorsey and Judge Roan go on a fishing trip, where they discuss the political climate and the upcoming election ("The Glory").

The governor agrees to re-open the case, and Leo and Lucille rejoice ("This Is Not Over Yet"). Slaton visits the factory girls, who admit to their exaggeration (“Factory Girls (Reprise)”), and Minnie, who claims that Dorsey intimidated her and made her sign a statement (“Minnie McKnight's Reprise”). Slaton also visits Jim Conley, who is back in jail as an accessory to the murder. Conley refuses to change his story despite the noticeable inconsistencies with the evidence, and along with his Chain Gang, does not give any information, much to the chagrin of Slaton ("Blues: Feel the Rain Fall"). A year later, after much consideration, he agrees to commute Leo's sentence to life in prison in Milledgeville, Georgia, a move that effectively ends his political career. The citizens of Marietta, led by Dorsey and Watson, are enraged and riot ("Where Will You Stand When the Flood Comes?").

Leo has been transferred to a prison work-farm. Lucille visits, and he realizes his deep love for his wife and how much he has underestimated her ("All the Wasted Time"). After Lucille departs from the prison, a party of masked men (including Starnes, Ivey, Frankie Epps, the Fulton Tower guard and the Old Confederate Soldier) arrives and kidnaps Leo. They take him to Marietta and demand he confess to the murder on pain of death. Leo refuses, and although Ivey is convinced of his innocence, the rest of group is determined to kill him. As his last request, Leo has a sack tied around his waist, since he is wearing only his nightshirt, and gives his wedding ring to Ivey to be given to Lucille. The group hangs him from an oak tree ("Sh'ma"). In 1916, a remorseful Britt Craig gives Leo's ring, which has been delivered to him anonymously, to Lucille. He is surprised to discover that she has no plans to leave Georgia, which is now governed by Dorsey, but she refuses to let Leo's ordeal be for nothing. Alone, she gives in to her grief, but she takes comfort in believing that Leo is with God and free from his ordeal. The Confederate Memorial Day Parade begins again ("Finale").

Note: In the 2023 Broadway revival, an epilogue is projected on the stage stating that Frank's case was reopened in 2019 and is still ongoing.

Musical numbers

 Act I
 Prologue: "The Old Red Hills of Home" – Young Soldier, Old Soldier, Ensemble
 Anthem: "The Dream of Atlanta" – Townspeople
 "How Can I Call This Home?" – Leo and Townspeople
 "The Picture Show" – Mary and Frankie
 "Leo At Work" / "What Am I Waiting For?" – Leo and Lucille
 "Interrogation: "I Am Trying to Remember..." – Newt Lee
 "Big News!" – Britt Craig
 Funeral: "There is a Fountain" / "It Don't Make Sense" – Frankie and Townspeople
 "Watson's Lullaby" – Tom Watson
 "Somethin' Ain't Right" – Hugh Dorsey
 "Real Big News" – Britt Craig and Townspeople
 "You Don't Know This Man" – Lucille
 "People of Atlanta" – Fiddling John, Tom Watson and Townspeople
 "Twenty Miles From Marietta" – Hugh Dorsey
 "Frankie's Testimony" – Frankie and Mary
 "Factory Girls / Come Up to My Office" – Iola, Essie, Monteen / Leo
 "Newt Lee's Testimony" – Newt Lee
 "My Child Will Forgive Me" – Mrs. Phagan
 "That's What He Said" – Jim Conley and Townspeople
 "Leo's Statement: It's Hard to Speak My Heart" – Leo
 "Closing Statements and Verdict" – Jurors and Townspeople

 Act II
 "It Goes On and On" - Britt Craig
 "Rumblin' and a Rollin'" – Riley, Angela, Jim Conley and Newt Lee
 "Do It Alone" – Lucille
 "Pretty Music" – Governor Slaton
 "Letter to the Governor" – Judge Roan
 "This Is Not Over Yet" – Leo and Lucille
 "Factory Girls (Reprise)" – Leo, Lucille, Iola and Factory Girls
 "Newt Lee's Reprise" – Leo, Lucille and Newt
 "Blues: Feel the Rain Fall" – Jim Conley and Chain Gang
 "Where Will You Stand When the Flood Comes?" – Tom Watson, Hugh Dorsey, and Townspeople
 "All the Wasted Time" – Leo and Lucille
 "Sh'ma" – Leo
 Finale: "The Old Red Hills of Home" – Lucille, Leo, Frankie, and Full Company

 Notes
 A  Cut for the Donmar Warehouse production and the 2023 Broadway revival.
 B  Replaced with "Hammer of Justice" in the Donmar Warehouse production and the 2023 Broadway revival.
 C  Replaced with "Minnie McKnight's Testimony" in the Donmar Warehouse production and the 2023 Broadway revival.
 D  Cut for the 2000 U.S. Tour, the Donmar Warehouse production and the 2023 Broadway revival.
 E  Replaced with "The Glory" in the Donmar Warehouse production and the 2023 Broadway revival.
 F  Replaced with "Minnie McKnight's Reprise" in the Donmar Warehouse production and the 2023 Broadway revival.

Characters and original cast

Productions

Broadway
The musical premiered on Broadway at the Vivian Beaumont Theater at Lincoln Center on December 17, 1998 and closed February 28, 1999, after 39 previews and 84 regular performances.  Directed by Harold Prince, it starred Brent Carver as Leo Frank, Carolee Carmello as Lucille Frank, and Christy Carlson Romano as Mary Phagan. Judith Dolan designed costumes for the production.

Most critics praised the show, especially the score. However, the public and some critics received the show coolly.  A number felt the show took too many liberties in the use of racial slurs. When the show closed, Livent had filed for bankruptcy protection (Chapter 11).  Lincoln Center was the other producer solely responsible for covering the weekly running costs.

US national tour
A US national tour, directed by Prince, started at the Fox Theatre in Atlanta, Georgia. It ran from June to October 2000, with Jason Robert Brown conducting at some venues. It starred David Pittu as Leo, Andrea Burns as Lucille, Keith Byron Kirk as Jim and Kristen Bowden as Mary.

London
The first major production in the United Kingdom played at the Donmar Warehouse from September 24 to November 24, 2007. It was directed by Rob Ashford and starred Lara Pulver as Lucille, Bertie Carvel as Leo, Jayne Wisener as Mary and Stuart Matthew Price as Young Soldier/Frankie. Pulver was nominated for the 2008 Laurence Olivier Award for Best Actress in a Musical and Carvel was nominated for Best Actor in a Musical. A double-CD cast recording of this production has been released by First Night Records. The recording includes new material written by Brown for the production and contains all songs and dialogue from the Donmar production. The large Broadway orchestration was reduced by David Cullen and Brown to a nine piece ensemble consisting of two pianos, accordion, percussion, clarinet, horn and strings.

Another off-West End production opened on August 10, 2011 for a 6-week engagement ending September 17, at the Southwark Playhouse's Vault Theatre. It was directed by Thom Southerland, with musical staging by Tim Jackson. Alastair Brookshaw played Leo, Laura Pitt-Pulford was Lucille, Simon Bailey was Tom and Mark Inscoe was Hugh.

Los Angeles
Parade was staged at the Neighborhood Playhouse in Palos Verdes Estates, California, from July 9, 2008. The production was directed by Brady Schwind. The production starred Craig D'Amico as Leo, Emily Olson as Lucille and Alissa Anderegg as Mary.

The Donmar production transferred to the Mark Taper Forum, Los Angeles, California, in September 2009, for a run through November 15, 2009. Pulver reprised her role as Lucille opposite T. R. Knight as Leo. The cast also included Michael Berresse, Christian Hoff, Hayley Podschun, Rose Sezniak and Phoebe Strole.

New York concerts
On February 16, 2015, a concert production of Parade was staged at Avery Fisher Hall in Lincoln Center by Manhattan Concert Productions, directed by Gary Griffin and conducted by composer Jason Robert Brown. Jeremy Jordan and Laura Benanti starred as Leo and Lucille, with Ramin Karimloo as Tom, Joshua Henry as Jim, Andy Mientus as Britt, Emerson Steele as Mary, Katie Rose Clarke as Mrs. Phagan, John Ellison Conlee as Hugh, Davis Gaines as Judge Roan/Old Soldier and Alan Campbell as Governor Slaton.

New York City Center staged Parade as the gala concert presentation of its 2022/2023 season, with a benefit performance on November 1 and a run continuing through November 6, 2022. Ben Platt and Micaela Diamond played Leo and Lucille Frank. Michael Arden directed and incorporated projections and photography of the real-life trial in the production. Other notable cast members included John Dossett as Old Soldier/Judge Roan, Manoel Felciano as Tom Watson, Jay Armstrong Johnson as Britt Craig, Sean Allan Krill as Governor Slaton, Jennifer Laura Thompson as Sally Slaton, Erin Mackey as Mrs. Phagan, Gaten Matarazzo as Frankie Epps, Erin Rose Doyle as Mary Phagan, Howard McGillin as Luther Rosser and Paul Alexander Nolan as Hugh Dorsey. Jason Robert Brown conducted the onstage orchestra. Script and score changes from the 2007 Donmar production were retained. Reviews for the run were strongly favorable, with Steven Suskin giving it 5 out of 5 stars and writing in New York Stage Review: "Rather than leaving its audience suitably impressed but emotionally unmoved as in prior viewings, Michael Arden’s spare but meticulous production unleashes the gripping theatricality of the writing that has heretofore been trapped within." Juan A. Ramírez wrote in The New York Times that Platt and Diamond's rendition of "This is Not Over Yet" was a "powerhouse for the ages. Their commanding vocals are matched by a confident production that revives the best of the original while pointing at the possibility of growth, and hope."

2023 Broadway revival
The City Center production started previews at Broadway's Bernard B. Jacobs Theatre on February 21, 2023 and opened on March 16. Platt and Diamond reprise their roles as Leo and Lucille Frank. The revival is planned to run through August 6. Platt and Diamond appeared on MSNBC's Morning Joe to announce the transfer. Reprising their City Center roles are Krill, Nolan, Johnson, Doyle, Danielle Lee Greaves as Minnie Knight, Alex Joseph Grayson as Jim Conley, Courtnee Carter as Angela, Eddie Cooper as Newt Lee, Douglas Lyons as Riley, and Manoel Felciano as Tom Watson. Joining them are Kelli Barrett as Mrs. Phagan, Howard McGillin, who played Luther Rosser at City Center, as Old Soldier/Judge Roan, and Jake Pedersen as Frankie Epps. 

On the night of the show's first preview, members of the neo-Nazi group National Socialist Movement protested against the production outside the theater. The revival has received mostly positive reviews, including those published by The New York Times ("well-judged and timely"), Time Out New York ("cause for celebration"), The Guardian ("dynamic and moving"), Entertainment Weekly ("more poignant and powerful than ever"), The New York Post ("Brown's finest music, and Platt's most heart-wrenching work ... Diamond, whose combination of fragility and power is thrilling for an actress so young, brings an electricity to her duets with Platt"), Variety ("theatrically thrilling"), New York Stage Review ("beautifully executed"), New York Theatre Guide ("uniformly terrific cast ... [Platt and Diamond] deliver"); a dissent was filed by Charles Isherwood in The Wall Street Journal ("Even a first-rate Parade cannot disguise the conceptual problems").

Awards and nominations

Original Broadway production

Original London production

Notes

References
Extensive website about the show
Cast and other information from the GeoCities Jason Robert Brown website
All the Wasted Time – Parade
Parade at the Music Theatre International website
Profile of the show at the NODA website indicating which characters sing which numbers

External links 

New York Times review, 12/18/98
List of numerous productions of Parade between 2001 and 2004
New York Times review of Los Angeles production, 12/14/09

1998 musicals
Broadway musicals
Musicals inspired by real-life events
Fiction set in 1913
Fiction set in 1914
Fiction set in 1915
Fiction set in 1916
Atlanta in fiction
Jews and Judaism in fiction
Antisemitism in fiction
Discrimination in fiction
Racism in fiction
Plays set in the 1910s
Musicals by Jason Robert Brown
Works by Alfred Uhry
Sung-through musicals
Tony Award-winning musicals